Gamma-1-syntrophin is a protein that in humans is encoded by the SNTG1 gene.

The protein encoded by this gene is a member of the syntrophin family. Syntrophins are cytoplasmic peripheral membrane proteins that typically contain 2 pleckstrin homology (PH) domains, a PDZ domain that bisects the first PH domain, and a C-terminal domain that mediates dystrophin binding. This gene is specifically expressed in the brain. Transcript variants for this gene have been described, but their full-length nature has not been determined.

References

Further reading